La República is a Peruvian newspaper based in Lima, Peru. It is one of the two main national daily newspapers sold all over the country since it was founded on November 16, 1981. The paper was founded by Gustavo Mohme Llona, a former member of the Peruvian Congress. Peruvian journalist Guillermo Thorndike served as the newspaper's founding editor.

Under Llona's leadership, La República was a staunch opponent of the government of President Alberto Fujimori (1990-2000). The newspaper overall has a left-wing political stance with small socialist opinions.

See also
 List of newspapers in Peru
 Media of Peru
Gustavo Mohme
Francisco Sagasti

References

External links
La República website

1981 establishments in Peru
Publications established in 1981
Republica
Republica
Mass media in Lima